|}
Cesar Daniel Felizia (born 6 April 1962) is an Argentine athlete specialising in Olympic shooting. He was South American champion in 2010 Medellín. He also competed at the 1984 Summer Olympics and the 2000 Summer Olympics.

Career
The sporting career of Cesar Daniel Felizia is identified by its participation in the following national and international events:

For the eighth time, he was the athlete with the highest number of medals from Argentina in Games Medellin 2010.
His performance in the ninth edition of the games, was identified as the 87th athlete with the highest number of medals to all participants of the event, with a total of 3 medals:
: Shooting 25m Pistol Men Fast
: Sport Shooting 25m Pistol Men Shooting Team Fast
: Sport Shooting Men's 25m Standard Pistol

See also
 2010 South American Games
 Argentina at the South American Games

References

External links
Participant Information on the 2010 South American Games 

1962 births
Living people
Argentine male sport shooters
Shooters at the 1999 Pan American Games
Pan American Games medalists in shooting
Shooters at the 2015 Pan American Games
Pan American Games gold medalists for Argentina
South American Games gold medalists for Argentina
South American Games bronze medalists for Argentina
South American Games medalists in shooting
Competitors at the 2010 South American Games
Olympic shooters of Argentina
Shooters at the 1984 Summer Olympics
Shooters at the 2000 Summer Olympics
Medalists at the 1999 Pan American Games
People from San Francisco, Córdoba
Sportspeople from Córdoba Province, Argentina
21st-century Argentine people